Martin Divilly (died August 1979) was Mayor of Galway from 1963 to 1964 and from 1970 to 1971.

Divilly used his terms of office to extend and expand Irish tourist links, particularly in the U.S., where he travelled extensively. He was made an honorary citizen of New Orleans and was officially received by Mayor of New York, Robert Wagner.

His first grandson, Jon Richards, now a DJ on Galway Bay FM, was baptised on the opening day of Galway's New Cathedral by Cardinal Cushing of Boston.

Divilly died in August 1979.

References
 Role of Honour:The Mayors of Galway City 1485-2001, William Henry, Galway 2001.

External links
 https://web.archive.org/web/20071119083053/http://www.galwaycity.ie/AllServices/YourCouncil/HistoryofTheCityCouncil/PreviousMayors/

Politicians from County Galway
Mayors of Galway
Year of birth missing
1979 deaths